Teth, also written as  or Tet, is the ninth letter of the Semitic abjads, including Phoenician Ṭēt , Hebrew 
Tēt , Aramaic Ṭēth , Syriac Ṭēṯ ܛ, and Arabic  . It is the 16th letter of the modern Arabic alphabet. The Persian ṭa is pronounced as a hard "t" sound and is the 19th letter in the modern Persian alphabet. The Phoenician letter also gave rise to the Greek theta, originally an aspirated voiceless dental stop but now used for the voiceless dental fricative. The Arabic letter (ط) is sometimes transliterated as tah in English, for example in Arabic script in Unicode.

Origins
According to another hypothesis (Brian Colless), the letter possibly continues a Middle Bronze Age glyph named  'good', Aramaic טַב 'tav', Hebrew  'tov', Syriac ܛܒܐ 'tava', modern Arabic  'ṭayyib', all of identical meaning, whose picture is based on the Nefer 'good' hieroglyph common in ancient Egyptian names (e.g. Nefertiti):

F35

Jewish scripture books about the "holy letters" from the 10th century onward discuss the connection or origin of the letter Teth with the word tov "good".
This was especially emphasized ever since the late 1600s after the Baal Shem Tov became influential, since the letter Teth was in his Acronym standing for Tov, and goodness was part of his philosophy.
The acrostic poems of the Bible use 'Tov' to represent the letter (e.g. Psalm 119:65-72).

Arabic ṭāʾ
The letter is named  طَاءْ; Modern Standard Arabic pronunciation: .

Hebrew Tet

The Hebrew spelling of name of the letter:

Hebrew pronunciation
In Modern Hebrew, Tet represents a voiceless alveolar plosive , and is therefore usually homophonic with the abjad's final letter, Tav ת. However, Tet can be pharyngealized to produce  in traditional Temani and Sephardi pronunciation.

Significance
In gematria, Tet represents the number nine. When followed by an apostrophe, it means 9,000. The most common example of this usage is in the numbers of the Hebrew years (e.g.,  in numbers would be the date 9754).

As well, in gematria, the number 15 is written with Tet and Vav, (9+6) to avoid the normal construction Yud and Hei (10+5) which spells a name of God. Similarly, 16 is written with Tet and Zayin (9+7) instead of Yud and Vav (10+6) to avoid spelling part of the Tetragrammaton.

Tet is also one of the seven letters which receive special crowns (called tagin) when written in a Sefer Torah. See Shin, Ayin, Gimmel, Nun, Zayin, and Tzadi.

Similar symbols
The Hebrew  is also visually similar to the letter Ʋ.

Character encodings

References

External links

Phoenician alphabet
Arabic letters
Hebrew letters